Calosoma elgonense is a species of ground beetle in the subfamily of Carabinae. It was described by Burgeon in 1928.

References

elgonense
Beetles described in 1928